The International Indian Treaty Council (IITC) is an organization of Indigenous Peoples from North, Central, South America, the Caribbean and the Pacific working for the Sovereignty and Self-Determination of Indigenous Peoples and the recognition and protection of Indigenous Rights, Treaties, Traditional Cultures and Sacred Lands.

History
The IITC was formed at a gathering on the land of the Standing Rock Sioux Tribe, in South Dakota, June 8–16, 1974. This gathering would later be known as the First International Indian Treaty Conference. This gathering, and the IITC which resulted from it, was called for by the American Indian Movement, and was attended by delegates from 97 Indian tribes and Nations from across North and South America.

IITC held the Second International Treaty Conference on the land of the Yanktonai Dakota people in Greenwood, South Dakota in June 16–20, 1976.

In 1976, Aboriginal Australian activist and poet Lionel Fogarty addressed a meeting of the IITC.

Organized by IITC in 1977, the International NGO Conference on Discrimination against Indigenous Populations in the Americas was held from September 20-23, 1977, in the Palais des Nations, Geneva, Switzerland. The conference is also referred to as the United Nations Conference on Indians in the Americas. 

Since 1977, the IITC has been recognized by the United Nations as a category II Non-governmental Organization (NGO) with Consultative Status with the UN Economic and Social Council, making it the first indigenous NGO to gain such status.

Objectives

The IITC's work includes supporting grassroots Indigenous struggles for human rights, self-determination and environmental justice through information dissemination, networking, coalition building, advocacy and technical assistance. The IITC aims to build, organize and facilitate the participation of Indigenous Peoples in local, regional, national and international events and gatherings addressing their concerns and survival. Working largely with international bodies, the IITC focuses on building Indigenous Peoples’ participation in key United Nations fora such as the Commission on Human Rights, the Working Group on Indigenous Populations, the Sub-Commission on Prevention of Discrimination and Protection of Minorities, the Conference of the Parties to the Convention on Biological Diversity, UNESCO and the Commission on Sustainable Development. In recent years, IITC has also participated in the International Labour Organization, U.N. World Conferences, the International Union for the Conservation of Nature and the World Archeological Congress to systematically address concerns vital to Indigenous Peoples.

The IITC cite their objectives as the following:

To seek, promote and build participation of Indigenous Peoples in the United Nations (UN) and its specialized agencies, as well as other international forums.
To seek international recognition for Treaties and Agreements between Indigenous Peoples and Nation-States.
To support the human rights, self-determination and sovereignty of Indigenous Peoples; to oppose colonialism in all its forms, and its effects upon Indigenous Peoples.
To build solidarity and relationships of mutual support among Indigenous Peoples of the world.
To disseminate information about Indigenous Peoples’ human rights issues, struggles, concerns and perspectives.
To establish and maintain one or more organizational offices to carry out IITC's information dissemination, networking and human rights programs.

The IITC also disseminates information about opportunities for international activism and involvement in grassroots Indigenous communities and tribes, and educates and builds awareness about Indigenous struggles among non-Indigenous Peoples and organizations. With the aim of facilitating indigenous participation in struggles for indigenous justice at the U.N. level, the IITC published a guide outlining how to write a shadow report.

Declaration for the Rights of Indigenous Peoples
The IITC was a major player in the process of drafting of the Declaration on the Rights of Indigenous Peoples (passed in 2007), and working towards its adoption by the United Nations. In 2004, during the 10th session of the Intersessional Working Group on the Draft Declaration on the Rights of Indigenous Peoples, the IITC helped to coordinate and carry out a hunger strike, protesting for the rights of indigenous peoples threatened by loss of land, environmental racism, toxic dumping, globalization and theft of mineral and water rights.

The Indigenous Peoples Sunrise Ceremony
Since the mid-1970s, IITC has organized the Indigenous Peoples' Sunrise Ceremony, an annual gathering held on the island of Alcatraz in San Francisco Bay, in the United States of America. Observed on the United States Thanksgiving holiday in November, this gathering and ceremony is held to honor the feast, held on Thanksgiving Day, on Alcatraz Island in 1969 during the Occupation of Alcatraz.

Treaty Council News
In 1977, the IITC began compiling and publishing the bulletin Treaty Council News. This periodical was one of the original indigenous news publications in the United States.  The IITC continues the publication of this bulletin in electronic format, via the IITC website.

Notable people
The International Indian Treaty Council was founded in 1974 by Bill Means (Oglala Lakota). People who have been involved with the IITC over time include Jimmie Durham, Paul Chaat Smith, Roxanne Dunbar-Ortiz, Bill Wahpepah (Sac & Fox), Hinewirangi Kohu Morgan, Bumpy Kanahele and Executive Director Andrea Carmen.

References

External links 
 

Indigenous peoples of the Americas
Organizations established in 1974
1974 establishments in South Dakota